Hard Country is a 1981 American drama Western film directed by David Greene and starring Jan-Michael Vincent, Kim Basinger (in her film debut), and Michael Parks. Written by Michael Kane and Michael Martin Murphey, the film is about a young woman who longs to escape the limitations of life in a small Texas town to pursue her dreams. She is prevented from leaving by her factory worker boyfriend who does not want her to move to the big city. The film features appearances by country music artists Tanya Tucker and Michael Martin Murphey.

Plot
Ambitious young Jodie wants more out of life than the small Texas country town she lives in has to offer. Jodie realizes that in order to pursue her dreams she will have to leave Texas and move to the big city. However, her shiftless factory worker boyfriend Kyle wants to stay in Texas.

Cast
 Jan-Michael Vincent as Kyle 
 Kim Basinger as Jodie 
 Michael Parks as Royce 
 Gailard Sartain as Johnny Bob
 Sierra Pecheur as Mama 
 John Chappell as Daddy 
 Tanya Tucker as Caroline 
 Daryl Hannah as Loretta
 Lewis Van Bergen as Ransom
 Ted Neeley as Wesley
 Curtis Credel as Dale
 Scotch Byerley as Aaron
 Richard Lineback as Larry
 Elise Caitlin as Cowgirl #1
 Danone Camden as Cowgirl #2
 Holly Haber as Cowgirl #3
 Richard Moll as Top Gun
 Ron Spivey as Kicker 
 Cisse Cameron as Royce's Wife
 Jack Rader as Planet Foreman 
 Laura Madison as Tracy Jo
 Delana Michaels as Telephone Operator 
 Teri Foster Brooks as Waitress
 David Haney as Bartender
 Garrie Kelly as Airline Interviewer
 A'leisha Brevard as Snoopy Lady
 Jay Kerr as Deputy 
 Cheryl Carter as Woman Customer
 Henry G. Sanders as Man Customer
 Tina Menard as Maid 
 Jane Abbott as Woman at Airport
 Dolores Aguirre as Security Guard
 Stephen C. Bradbury as Airport Clerk
 West Buchanan as Airport Agent
 Kirby Buchanan as Airport Police #1
 Mitch Carter as Airport Police #2
 Michael Martin Murphey as Michael
 Mike Hearne as Lead Guitar
 Jody Mephis as Drums
 Mark Webernick as Piano 
 Rick Fowler as Bass
 David Ellis Coe as Fidde
 Hank Corwin as Steel Guitar 
 Katy Moffatt as Special Guest

See also
 List of American films of 1981

References

External links

1981 films
American drama films
1980s English-language films
1981 drama films
Films directed by David Greene
Films scored by Jimmie Haskell
ITC Entertainment films
1980s American films